Arapaho Center station (formerly known as Richardson Transit Center until 2002) is a DART Light Rail station in Richardson, Texas. It is located at Greenville Avenue near Arapaho Road.

Customer features at this station include: station concierge, passenger shelters, windscreens, seating, restrooms, customer information, ticket vending machines, telephones, bus "kiss & ride" passenger drop-off/pickup area, free parking (1,100 spaces, overnight or long-term parking is at the discretion of the customer), bike rack and public art.

Nearby attractions and destinations include: Chinatown, Richardson Civic Center, University of Texas at Dallas (via bus route 362), Collins Technology Park, Honeywell, Inet Technologies, Intrusion, Optical Switch, and Samsung Telecommunications

External links
 DART - Arapaho Center Station

Dallas Area Rapid Transit light rail stations
Richardson, Texas
Railway stations in the United States opened in 2002
2002 establishments in Texas
Railway stations in Dallas County, Texas